A list of films produced in Italy in 1915 (see 1915 in film):

External links
 Italian films of 1915 at the Internet Movie Database

Italian
1915
Films